Auxant is a commune in the Côte-d'Or department in the Bourgogne-Franche-Comté region of central-eastern France.

Geography
Auxant is located some 20 km north-west of Beaune and 12 km east of Arnay-le-Duc. Access to the commune is by the D 970 road from Sainte-Sabine in the north which passes through the centre of the commune east of the village and continues south-east to Bligny-sur-Ouche. The D 17 road from Antigny-le-Château in the west passes through the south of the commune and joins the D 970 to the south-east. Access to the village is by local roads from the D 970 and from the south. There are large forests in the north-west of the commune (the Forêt d'Auxant and the Bois Fein) with the rest of the commune farmland.

The Eclin river flows through the commune from north-west to south-east and continues to join the Ouche at Bligny-sur-Ouche. The Ruisseau de Navelan rises in the north-east of the commune and flows south-west to join the Eclin near the village.

Neighbouring communes and villages

History
The church dates to 1830, the same year as three Wayside Crosses and a Cemetery Cross.

Administration

List of Successive Mayors

Demography
In 2017 the commune had 74 inhabitants.

See also
Communes of the Côte-d'Or department

References

External links
Auxant on the old IGN website 
Auxant on Géoportail, National Geographic Institute (IGN) website 
Aussan on the 1750 Cassini Map

Communes of Côte-d'Or